Jeffrey Allen Ridgway (born August 17, 1980) is a former Major League Baseball player. A pitcher, Ridgway made his Major League Baseball debut with the Tampa Bay Devil Rays on September 17, .

In 2007, Ridgway had an ERA of 189.00. As of August 2019, Ridgway's 189.00 ERA in 2007 is the highest single-season ERA of any pitcher in MLB history, tied with Joe Cleary's 1945 season and Jack Scheible's 1894 season.

On January 17, Ridgway was traded to the Atlanta Braves for Willy Aybar and Chase Fontaine. On June 11, 2008, Ridgway was called up after Tom Glavine got injured and was placed on the DL. He made his Atlanta debut the same day and pitched 2 scoreless innings.

On March 30, Ridgway was released by the Braves.

On December 16, 2009, Ridgway signed a Minor League contract with the Washington Nationals, but never played a game in their farm system.

References

External links

1980 births
Living people
Baseball players from Washington (state)
Charleston RiverDogs players
Durham Bulls players
Tampa Bay Devil Rays players
Major League Baseball pitchers
Richmond Braves players
Atlanta Braves players
People from Port Angeles, Washington
Southern Maryland Blue Crabs players
Princeton Devil Rays players
Bakersfield Blaze players
Visalia Oaks players
Montgomery Biscuits players